The 1945–46 Belgian First Division was contested by 19 teams, and KV Mechelen won the championship.

Overview

League standings

Results

References

Belgian Pro League seasons
1945–46 in Belgian football
Belgian